Helen Crawfurd ( Jack, later Anderson; 9 November 1877 – 18 April 1954) was a Scottish suffragette, rent strike organiser, Communist activist and politician. Born in Glasgow, she was brought up there and in London.

Biography
Born Helen Jack at 175 Cumberland Street in the Gorbals area of Glasgow, her parents were Helen L. ( Kyle) and William Jack. Her mother worked a steam-loom before she wed. Helen's family moved to Ipswich while she was young. Crawfurd later went to school in London and Ipswich before moving back to Glasgow as a teenager. Crawfurd's father, a master baker, was a Catholic, but converted to the Church of Scotland and became a conservative trade unionist.

Initially religious herself and a Sunday School teacher, Crawfurd felt a call to be married at 21 to the 67-year-old widower Alexander Montgomerie Crawfurd (29 August 1828 – 31 May 1914), a Church of Scotland minister and family friend. but he became increasingly radical. Alexander died aged 85 at 17 Sutherland Street in Partick, Glasgow.

In 1944, Crawfurd remarried, to widower George Anderson of Anderson Brothers Engineers, Coatbridge. Her second husband was a member of the Communist Party of Great Britain. George Anderson died on 2 February 1952 and Crawfurd two years later at Mahson Cottage, Kilbride Avenue, Dunoon, Argyll, aged 76.

Political activity
Crawfurd first became active in the women's suffrage movement in about 1900, then in 1910 at a meeting in Rutherglen. Crawfurd was jailed three times for "militant" political activity during her career as an activist. In 1912, Crawfurd smashed the windows of Jack Pease, Minister for Education, and received a one-month prison sentence. In March 1914, Crawfurd was arrested in Glasgow when Emmeline Pankhurst was speaking. She received another month in prison and went on an eight-day hunger strike.  She spoke at the Music Hall, Aberdeen on 26 February 1914, in favour of militarism. But after one further arrest, Crawfurd left the WSPU in protest at its support of the First World War and in 1914 she joined the Independent Labour Party (ILP).

During the war, Crawfurd was involved with the Red Clydeside movement, including the Glasgow rent strikes in 1915 when she led the South Govan Women's Housing Association to resist rent increases and prevent evictions, alongside Mary Barbour, Mary Laird, Mary Jeff and Agnes Dollan. Crawfurd had co-founded the Glasgow branch of the Women's International League and become secretary of the Women's Peace Crusade. By then she had met Agnes Harben and others, who held the same international perspectives. On 23 July 1916, Crawfurd organised the first demonstration of the Women's Peace Crusade, which was attended by 5,000. Crawfurd formed a branch of the United Suffragists in Glasgow.

In 1918, Crawfurd was elected as vice-chair of the Scottish division of the Independent Labour Party (ILP), and was said to be a convincing speaker when she spoke in the Market Place at the branch meeting in Loftus. Shortly afterwards, Crawfurd became a founder member of the ILP's left-wing faction, which was campaigning for it to affiliate to the Communist International. Crawford went to Moscow in 1920, with Marjory Newbold, Sylvia Pankhurst, Willie Gallacher and others for the Congress of the Third Communist International and interviewed Lenin. When the affiliation policy was defeated, Crawfurd joined the new Communist Party of Great Britain (CPGB). She served on its Central Committee and involved herself in various journalistic projects. She also became secretary of Workers' International Relief.

In 1919, Crawfurd was a delegate to the Congress of the Women's International League in Zürich.

Crawfurd ran in 1921 as the first Communist Party candidate in the Govan ward of Glasgow.

In 1927, Crawfurd was an official delegate to the Brussels International Conference against Oppressed Nationalities, at which the League against Imperialism was established. Crawfurd joined the executive of the British section.

Crawfurd stood for the CPGB in Bothwell at the 1929 general election, and Aberdeen North in 1931, but did not come close to being elected.

During the 1930s, Crawfurd was prominent in the Friends of the Soviet Union. She unsuccessfully stood for Dunoon Town Council in 1938. However, she was elected as Dunoon's first woman town councillor shortly after the war, but retired from it in 1947 due to poor health.

Helen Crawfurd (by then Mrs Anderson) died in 1954 at Mahson Cottage, Kilbride Avenue, Dunoon, Argyll, aged 76.

References

1877 births
1954 deaths
Communist Party of Great Britain councillors
Councillors in Scotland
People from Gorbals
Scottish suffragists
Scottish suffragettes
Scottish pacifists
Red Clydeside
Scottish communists
19th-century Scottish women
20th-century Scottish women
Scottish socialist feminists
Pacifist feminists
Hunger Strike Medal recipients
Scottish women activists
Scottish anti-war activists
Women councillors in Scotland
20th-century Scottish women politicians
20th-century Scottish politicians
20th-century British women politicians
Women's Social and Political Union